Legion of the Damned may refer to:

 Legion of the Damned (band), a thrash metal/death metal band from the Netherlands
 Legion of the Damned (film), a 1969 film starring Jack Palance
 Legion of the Damned (novel), a 1993 novel by William C. Dietz
 The Legion of the Damned (novel), a novel by Sven Hassel
 Legion of the Damned (Warhammer 40,000), a chapter of Space Marines in the fictional Warhammer 40,000 universe